The following is  a list of European countries by coal production in 2014, based mostly on the Statistical Review of World Energy published in 2015 by British Petroleum, ranking nations with coal production larger than 0.05 percent of world production. Amounts are expressed in tonnes of oil equivalent.

References

Energy-related lists by country
Production by country

Coal-related lists